Tsang Gi Ni (倪章祺), also known as Fichen Ni (倪维城), was a noted Chinese physiologist during the first fifty years of the 20th century.

Ni was born on August 6, 1891, in Sonlin (双林), Chekiang Province (Zhejiang 浙江), China. In 1908, he attended Chekiang First High School, which was considered to be one of the four best high schools in the Southern Yangtze River. Today, it's known as Hangzhou High School (杭州高级中学).

After his graduation in 1912, T.G. Ni became one of sixty students in the first class of the Chekiang Medical College (浙江省立医药专门学校), the first public medical school in China, which is recognized today as part of the Zhejiang University School of Medicine (浙江大学医学院).

He received his bachelor's in medicine in 1916 and went on to work at the Chekiang Army Hospital (浙江陆军军医院) as a Surgeon-Lieutenant. At the same time, T.G. Ni had passed the qualifying exam for the Boxer Indemnity Scholarship and initially intended to study in Germany. However, with the outbreak of World War I, he was reassigned to the United States and ended up at the University of Michigan (密西根大学) in Ann Arbor, Michigan.

Study in the U.S. 
By 1919, T.G. Ni had received his M.S. and worked towards his doctorate degree with Professor Warren P. Lombard. He was also a member of the Cosmopolitan Club and Chinese Student Club. T.G. Ni's graduate studies at the University of Michigan Medical School lasted until 1922, when he was awarded a degree of Doctor of Science. His doctoral dissertation, The Active Response of Capillaries of Frogs, Tadpoles, Fish, Bats and Men to Various Forms of Excitation, was published in the American Journal of Physiology that same year.

Following his graduation, Dr. T.G. Ni was offered a fellowship at the Hsiang-Ya Medical College (湘雅医学院), but since he wanted more experiences in the U.S., he declined their offer. Instead, he focused on his post-doctoral study at the University of Minnesota (明尼苏达大学) in Minneapolis from 1922 until 1923 and then worked as a research fellow at Harvard Medical School (哈佛医学院) until 1924.

Return to China 
When Dr. T.G. Ni returned to China in 1924, he started to work at the Peking Union Medical College (PUMC, 北京协和医学院) alongside a pioneer of Chinese physiology, Dr. Robert Kho-seng Lim (林可胜). Dr. Ni then became one of the founding members of the Chinese Physiological Society (中国生理学会), which was established on February 27, 1926. He was also a member of the Chinese Medical Association (中华医学会), the Chinese Medico-Pharmaceutical Association (中华医药学会), and the Science Society of China (中国科学社).

From 1929 to 1930, Dr. Ni also took part in research, studies, and work at the University of Rochester in the United States, Plymouth University in England, and the University of Copenhagen in Denmark, where he worked with the Danish physiologist Poul Brandt Rehberg.

When he left PUMC in 1932, Dr. Ni went to the Henry Lester Institute of Medical Research in Shanghai (上海雷士德医学研究所). In December 1941, the Institute was occupied by the Japanese and was severely damaged that it could not recover from even after the Japanese army's surrender in 1945. After Communism settled over the land in 1949, it became known as the Shanghai Industrial Institute in 1954 and later changed to Shanghai Research Institute of Food Industries (上海食品工业科学研究所).

The Chinese Academy of Sciences published The Chinese Academy of Sciences 1949–1950 National Scientist Survey, which recommended 233 experts in thirteen groups – Dr. Ni was among 45 figures in the group of physiology, alongside Dr. R.K.S. Lim and Dr. Hsien Wu (吴宪).

Legacy 
In addition to his medical accomplishments, Dr. T.G. Ni was the author of multiple publications between the years 1919 and 1950, writing more than forty papers in The Journal of Laboratory and Clinical Medicine, The American Journal of Physiology, The Journal of the Science, The Chinese Journal of Physiology（《中国生理学报》, and The China Medical Journal（《中华医学杂志》）.

He co-authored the first paper of Dr. R.K.S. Lim after Dr. Lim was appointed as head of the physiology department at PUMC.

T.G. Ni retired from the Shanghai Research Institute of Food Industries in 1958 and died on March 12, 1965. He was survived by his wife, one daughter, and two sons.

Writers from Hangzhou
1891 births
1965 deaths
University of Michigan Medical School alumni
Chinese physiologists
Republic of China science writers
20th-century Chinese physicians
Physicians from Zhejiang